Ecclitica philpotti is a species of moth of the family Tortricidae. It is endemic to New Zealand.

References

Moths described in 1978
Archipini
Moths of New Zealand
Endemic fauna of New Zealand
Endemic moths of New Zealand